Buster Juul (born 31 March 1993) is a Danish handball player for Aalborg Håndbold and the Danish national team.

He made international debut on the Danish national team in April 2016, against Faroe Islands.

Achievements 
EHF Champions League:
Runner-up: 2021
Håndboldligaen:
Winner: 2017, 2019, 2020 and 2021
Bronze Medalist: 2014
Danish Cup:
Winner: 2019, 2021
Danish Super Cup:
Winner: 2019, 2020, 2021

References

1993 births
Living people
People from Slagelse Municipality
Danish male handball players
Aalborg Håndbold players
Sportspeople from Region Zealand